Associazione Sportiva Dilettantistica Riviera di Romagna Calcio Femminile is an Italian women's football club from Cervia. The club had participated in Serie A, but withdrew from the league in 2016. It was established in 2010 from the merge of second-tier clubs Dinamo Ravenna and Cervia CF, and it was promoted one year later. In its Serie A debut it was tenth.

History
In 2015 it was relegated to Serie B after four season in the top tier. However, the team was a repêchage of  season. In 2016 the team was relegated again. At the start of 2016–17 season, the club withdrew the first team from the league system.

Season by season

Players

Notable former players
Those former Riviera di Romagna players had represented their countries in international level:
  Italy: Michela Greco, Simona Sodini
  Portugal: Raquel Infante, Carolina Mendes
  Romania: Monika Sinka

References

External links
  

Women's football clubs in Italy
Football clubs in Emilia-Romagna
Association football clubs established in 2010
Province of Ravenna